Have a Nice Trip is the fourth studio album by the German heavy metal band Die Apokalyptischen Reiter, released by Nuclear Blast Records on 17 March 2003. It peaked at #95 in the German Media Control Charts.

Track listing
  Vier Reiter Stehen Bereit – 3:42		
  Warum? – 3:35		
  Sehnsucht – 4:10		
  Terra Nola – 4:48		
  We Will Never Die – 3:48		
  Baila Conmígo – 3:51		
  Ride On – 2:47		
  Du Kleiner Wicht – 2:46		
  Komm – 3:10		
  Das Paradies – 5:00		
  Fatima – 3:55		
  Wo Die Geister Ganz Still Sterben – 4:13		
  Seid Willkommen – 4:14		
  Master Of The Wind – 5:42

References

Die Apokalyptischen Reiter albums
2003 albums
Albums produced by Andy Classen